TVU may refer to:

Entertainment and Media 
 RadioU TV, formerly known as TVU, an American Christian rock music channel
 TVU (Chile), Chilean educational channel
 TVUnetworks, a company that manufactures live mobile television broadcasting equipment
 The Velvet Underground, was an American rock band
 The Veer Union, a Canadian rock band
 TV-U Fukushima, a television station (channel 26 digital) licensed to Fukushima, Fukushima Prefecture, Japan
 TV-U Yamagata, a television station (channel 20 digital) licensed to Yamagata, Yamagata Prefecture, Japan

Universities 
 Technical and Vocational University, a public university in Iran
 Thames Valley University, a university in England

Other
 Matei Airport (IATA airport code)